The 2008 Lafayette Leopards football team was an American football team that represented Lafayette College in the 2008 NCAA Division I FCS football season. The team was led by Frank Tavani, in his ninth season as head coach, and placed fourth in the Patriot League. 

The Leopards played their home games at Fisher Stadium in Easton, Pennsylvania.

Schedule

References

Lafayette
Lafayette Leopards football seasons
Lafayette Leopards football